Events in the year 2014 in Slovenia.

Incumbents
President: Borut Pahor
Prime Minister: Alenka Bratušek

Events

May
 5 May - Slovenian Prime Minister Alenka Bratušek resigns after losing the leadership of her party 10 days earlier.

June
 1 June – Slovenian President Borut Pahor dissolves parliament and schedules an early election for 13 July.

July
 13 July - The parliamentary election in Slovenia is held.

September
 18 September - Miro Cerar is sworn in as Prime Minister of Slovenia.

Births

Deaths

References

 
2010s in Slovenia
Slovenia
Slovenia
Years of the 21st century in Slovenia